Vz or VZ may refer to:

Peoples:

 Volodymyr Zelenskyy, president of Ukraine

Businesses and brands:
 VZ Holding, a Swiss financial service company
 Toyota VZ engine A series of V6 engines
 Holden VZ Commodore, a model of GM Holden's Commodore produced from 2004 to 2006
 Thai Vietjet Air (current airline, IATA code VZ) 
 MyTravel Airways (former airline, IATA code VZ)
 Verizon Communications (NYSE stock symbol VZ)

Other uses:
 Varaždin, Croatia (license plate code VZ)
 Veer-Zaara, a Bollywood film
 Virtualization, typically of computer systems
 Vorzugsaktie, a German abbreviation for Preferred stock